Mecistophylla asthenitis is a species of Snout Moth in the genus Mecistophylla. It was described by Turner in 1904, and is known from Queensland, Australia.

References

Notes
α.The header on the published version of Turner's manuscript misspells his middle name as "Fefferis" instead of "Jefferis".

Moths described in 1904
Tirathabini